Fahd bin Sultan University (FBSU) is one of the private universities and the first private university using English as a medium of instruction in  Saudi Arabia.

History and profile
FBSU was established in Tabuk as a private college in 2003 under the patronage of Prince Fahd bin Sultan, governor of Tabuk Province. At the initial phase, it included only College of Computing. In the academic year 2007-2008, a branch for female students was added, and the college was opened by the late Sultan bin Abdulaziz. One year later, two colleges were added; the College of Engineering and of Business and Management. Therefore, the university is made up of three colleges, all focusing on technical fields. It provides undergraduate and postgraduates programs.

The campus of the university is 10 km away from Tabuk. In October 2011, it gained the status of the university. It is accredited by ABET.

Governance
The university is governed by a board of trustees chaired by Prince Fahd. Ahmed Nasri is the president of the University.

Partnership
FBSU is in close relationship with American University of Beirut that provides technical and consultative support. The collaboration between two institutions began in 2006. In April 2013, FBSU joined the SAP University Alliance Program, being the eleventh Saudi university that is part of the program.

References

External links
 Official YouTube Channel of the University

2003 establishments in Saudi Arabia
Educational institutions established in 2003
Private universities and colleges in Saudi Arabia
Tabuk, Saudi Arabia
Universities and colleges in Saudi Arabia